Al Davies may refer to:

Alun Davies (disambiguation)
Alan Davies (disambiguation)
Albert Davies (disambiguation)

See also
Al Davis (disambiguation)